World Voices was a vocal ensemble based in Minneapolis/Saint Paul, conducted by Dr. Karle Erickson, Artistic Director.  The ensemble was founded in 1996 as "Karle Erickson’s Metropolitan Chorale", but changed its name to World Voices within one season.  It performed until its dissolution in 2008.  At each of its concerts, World Voices focused on the music of a particular culture or region of the world.  Membership in the chorale has ranged from about 25 to 40 vocalists over its 13 years of existence.

The ensemble routinely collaborates with instrumentalists associated with the music from a specific culture. Among the artists World Voices has collaborated with are:

 Sowah Mensah, Master Drummer from Ghana
 Gao Hong, Chinese pipa artist
 Brent Michael Davids, composer and crystal flute player from the Mohican Nation
 Reverend Tony Machado from Puerto Rico
 Neil Newman, Cantor at Beth El Synagogue in Minneapolis
 Hua Chen, erhu player
 Lakota George Estes, flute player/maker from the Lakota Sioux Tribe
 Nicolas Carter, Paraguayan harpist
 Zeljko Pavlovic, violinist from Sarajevo
 The University of Minnesota Steel Drum Ensemble

World Voices commissioned several original works, including “Wo Ayi Me A Ma” by Sowah Mensah in March 2001, “Of This Turtle Isle” by Brent Michael Davids in 2002, “Si Ji” by Chinese composer Zhou Long in March 2005, and "Medicine Woman" by Janika Vandervelde in 2006 with Cochise Anderson playing Native American flutes and percussion.

World Voices performed music from at least 62 countries in 35 different languages. Seven CD's of global music have been released: “Latino Groove”, “A Cultural Odyssey”, “A Global Palette”, “ Celebrating Global Cultures” and “Mosaic", "A World of Christmas", and "Hope for Our Time."

External links
World Voices
Karle Erickson

Notes

Choirs in Minnesota
Musical groups established in 1996
Musical groups from the Twin Cities